François Xavier Nguyên Van Sang (8 January 1932 – 5 October 2017) was a Roman Catholic bishop.

Ordained to the priesthood in 1958, Nguyên Van Sang served as auxiliary bishop of the Roman Catholic Archdiocese of Há Nô, Vietnam, from 1981 to 1990. He then served as bishop of the Roman Catholic Diocese of Thái Bính from 1990 to 2009.

See also
Catholic Church in Vietnam

Notes

1932 births
2017 deaths
21st-century Roman Catholic bishops in Vietnam
20th-century Roman Catholic bishops in Vietnam